Clandestine Blaze is a one-man black metal band formed by Mikko Aspa in Lahti, Finland in 1998. Aspa cites Darkthrone, Burzum, Beherit, and Bathory as key influences. Aspa is also currently involved in many other projects, such as Stabat Mater, Creamface, Fleshpress, AM, Grunt, Clinic of Torture, Alchemy of the 20th Century, and Nicole 12.

Aspa is also the owner of Northern Heritage, a record label that has released albums by Baptism, Mgła, Behexen, Deathspell Omega, Drudkh, Hate Forest, Ildjarn, Peste Noire, and Satanic Warmaster, among others. In addition, Aspa is the owner of CF Productions (which produces the pornographic Erotic Perversion magazines and Public Obscenities videos) and Freak Animal Records (a power electronics / noise label).

Ties to National Socialist black metal
Mikko Aspa has long been accused of being one of the major influencers of the Finnish National Socialist black metal scene, expressing racism, anti-Semitism, white supremacy, and social Darwinism in his lyrics on Clandestine Blaze. His record shop Sarvilevyt, which is also the base of operations of his labels Northern Heritage and Freak Animal Records, sells both NSBM bands' records and merchandise, as well as neo-Nazi literature. He has also expressed support for Jesse Eppu Torniainen, a leading member of the Finnish branch from the Nordic Resistance Movement; an extremist far-right organization and has supported NSBM artists outside of Finland and collaborated directly with various known Finnish NSBM and RAC acts like Goatmoon, Pagan Skull, and Vapaudenristi. Various bands that have been signed to Northern Heritage or have collaborated with Aspa in some form have been heavily scrutinized for being associated with him, most notably Mgła and Deathspell Omega

Members
 Mikko Aspa - all instruments, vocals (1998-)

Live musicians
 Darkside - drums (2015-2016)
 M. - guitar (2015-2016)
 E.V.T. - guitar (2015-2016)
 The Fall - bass (2015-2016)

Discography

Demos
 Promo '98 (1998)
 There Comes the Day... (Northern Heritage, 2001)
 Below the Surface of Cold Earth (Northern Heritage, 2002)
 Blood and Cum (Northern Heritage, 2002)
 Goat - Creative Alienation (Northern Heritage, 2002)

Albums
 Fire Burns in Our Hearts (Blackmetal.com / Northern Heritage, 1999)
 Night of the Unholy Flames (Northern Heritage / End All Life, 2000)
 Fist of the Northern Destroyer (Northern Heritage / End All Life, 2002)
 Deliverers of Faith (Northern Heritage, 2004)
 Church of Atrocity (Northern Heritage, 2006)
 Falling Monuments (Northern Heritage, 2010)
 Harmony of Struggle (Northern Heritage, 2013)
 New Golgotha Rising (Northern Heritage, 2015)
 City of Slaughter (Northern Heritage, 2017)
 Tranquility of Death (Northern Heritage, 2018)
 Secrets of Laceration (Northern Heritage, 2021)

Split albums and EPs
 On the Mission EP (Northern Neritage, 1999)
 Split with Deathspell Omega (Northern Heritage, 2001)
 Split with Satanic Warmaster (Northern Heritage, 2004)
 Crushing the Holy Trinity split with Deathspell Omega, Stabat Mater, Musta Surma, Mgła & Exordium (Northern Heritage, 2005)

Compilations
 Archive Volume 1 (Northern Heritage, 2008)
 Archive Volume 2 (Northern Heritage, 2008)
 Archive Volume 3 (Northern Heritage, 2008)

References

External links
Interview at Diabolical Conquest Webzine
Interview at Worm Gear
Interview at The Vexation Sleep
Interview at Chronicles of Chaos

Finnish black metal musical groups
Finnish heavy metal musical groups
Musical groups established in 1998
Black metal controversies
Neo-Nazism in Finland